The men's 500 metres races of the 2015–16 ISU Speed Skating World Cup 3, arranged in Eisstadion Inzell, in Inzell, Germany, were held on 4 and 6 December 2015.

Gilmore Junio of Canada won race one, while his compatriot Alexandre St-Jean came second, and Artur Waś of Poland came third. David Bosa of Italy won the first Division B race.

Waś won race two, with Alex Boisvert-Lacroix of Canada in second place, and Kai Verbij of the Netherlands in third. Roman Krech of Kazakhstan won the second Division B race.

Race 1
Race one took place on Friday, 4 December, with Division B scheduled in the afternoon session, at 12:20, and Division A scheduled in the evening session, at 17:29.

Division A

Division B

Race 2
Race two took place on Sunday, 6 December, with Division B scheduled in the morning session, at 09:59, and Division A scheduled in the afternoon session, at 16:08.

Division A

Division B

References

Men 0500
3